"Provider" is episode 12 of season 3 in the television show Angel.

Plot
Fred works on the Angel Investigations website, while Cordelia talks to Angel about not losing sight of the mission – it is about helping the helpless, not making money. Gunn and Wesley return to report that they've distributed fliers all over town... with the wrong phone number. They correct and redistribute the fliers. Fred rocks Connor while Wesley and Gunn admire the adorable scenery. Angel comes in and starts issuing instructions, but can't figure out what comes first - making money, finding Holtz, or helping the helpless (in fact, his confusion is more than vaguely reminiscent of Monty Python's Flying Circus' The Spanish Inquisition sketch). Almost immediately, the phones start ringing.

Holtz and Justine lurk underground, discussing Justine's failure to follow orders - she had dusted two vampires that Holtz had told her to stay away from. He questions her commitment, and the camera shifts to show her hand impaled on a spike. He tells her to take it out if she chooses – but that if she lasts until the morning they'll continue as partners.

Angel Investigations is flooded with customers. Everyone is busy, and Cordelia says they're being stretched a little thin, but Angel claims they can handle it. When Cordy tells him to answer the phones he seems more interested in the pocketbooks of the people on the other end than their problems. Gunn talks to a woman whose dead ex is stalking her, while Wesley and Lorne talk to three demons in chrome face masks who, Lorne says (translating), having read some of Wesley's work, want to buy his head. When he clarifies he tells Wes that they want him to solve a traditional puzzle for them. While they're talking Fred notices the complicated geometric pattern on the demons' tunics, and they leave suddenly to either consult their prince or eat a cheesemonkey.

Angel meets with a wealthy business owner, Harlan Elster, who is concerned about a nest of vampires. He asks if Angel has any experience with vampires - to which Angel replies "some". Elster says that these ones are different - they want money, not blood. Elster says they've been putting the squeeze on local businessmen, threatening their employees for money. They've demanded $5000.00, so he offers Angel $10,000.00 to get rid of them, with 50% up front. As Angel leaves, the real Mr. Elster walks in, and the man Angel has been speaking to punches him out.

Holtz returns to find Justine where he left her. He tells her to go out and find people who have the same rage they do. He pulls the spike out of her hand, and she punches him and leaves.

Angel returns to find the hotel nearly empty. Cordelia expresses concern that they might miss someone who really needs help in all their cases. Lorne and Fred return – Lorne quite drunk. Lorne says that Holtz has poisoned his previous minions, and is looking to replace them with humans. Before Lorne can leave, the chrome-faced demons return asking for Fred this time – they were impressed with her before, and they've brought $50,000.00. Lorne and Fred leave for the job – it should be a couple of days.

Gunn and Wesley help out the woman with the stalker ex-boyfriend. Their conversation indicates that both Wes and Gunn are interested in Fred. The boyfriend attacks, and they fight it off, confirming he's become a zombie. Fred and Lorne arrive at the boat where the demons are staying, and Fred immediately sets to work on their puzzle. Lorne is not feeling so well, and leaves to go throw up. On his way to the facilities he overhears a conversation which indicates that his original translation to Wesley was accurate - they really do want a head, to replace that of their prince, who appears unwell. They've decided on Fred's.

Angel cleans out the vampire nest, but when he returns to Elster he learns that the man who gave him the – forged – check for the first $5000.00 is an ex-employee of Elster's who lost a friend and developed a "crazy" belief that this building was full of vampires.

Angel surprises the fake Elster in the vampire's lair. He grabs the watch the guy is holding, which the guy says was worth more than the ten grand he had been planning to pay Angel – because it was the first thing he ever bought his friend. When Angel says he didn't kill the three vamps for nothing, the man corrects him on the number – there were seven vamps.

Cordelia, watching the baby, tries to float as she did in the last episode, while explaining to him how she became part demon to cope with the visions. While putting the money away she gets a vision of what the demons are planning to do to Fred. She whispers for Fred not to solve the puzzle, just as Fred says with satisfaction that it shouldn't be long. Wes and Gunn are in full swing fighting the zombie boyfriend, and Cordy knows Angel won't answer his phone, so she heads to the marina herself to return the money and save Fred. The girl and the Zombie boyfriend squabble about their relationship - and it comes out that she killed him. He says he'd forgive her if she took him back, and after some pleading she agrees to give it another shot.

The rest of the vamps attack Angel and the man, while Angel refuses to help because he hasn't been paid. The guy apologizes for lying to him, and Angel agrees to help him barricade the doors while they discuss payment options. Fred solves the puzzle, and they take her away while she asks nervously after Lorne. They take her to the room with the prince, where Lorne is tied up. He explains the plan, while the demons get ready to cut off Fred's head. Cordy shows up just in time to stop them, still holding baby Connor, and tries to give back the money in exchange for Fred, but Lorne, assuming the whole team is there, accidentally aggravates the situation in his translation.

Angel smashes a window to get the guy out before the vamps can break in, but the guy refuses to leave, saying if he runs now, after what happened to his friend, he'll be running the rest of his life. Angel reluctantly slays the vamps, grousing about the lack of payment, and walks off as the guy tries to thank him, stopping to answer his beeper, but unable to work it.

Cordelia tries to kick one of the demons in the groin, but a metallic clang indicates it is useless. Wesley and Gunn arrive, and take on the demons, saving Fred, temporarily, but also knocking off the prince's head. Angel arrives somewhat late and takes on the remaining demons before anyone is seriously hurt. Angel apologises to Cordelia for leaving her and Connor alone. Fred, released, quotes the first line of Kipling's "if": "If you can keep your head when all about you are losing theirs" and tells Gunn and Wes she could kiss them both, but when they step forward Lorne draws their attention to the fact that he's still tied up on the floor. Angel tells the gang he got carried away with the money thing because he's never had anyone dependent on him the way Connor is now and not wanting to let him down. Distracted by the pile of returned cash scattered over the floor, he continues that family, and the mission, come first. Cordelia, also looking at the money, declares that after what they tried to do to Fred the Angel team has earned it.

Angel and Cordelia are lying in bed feeding the baby while talking about what to spend their money on. Angel insists they use it for Connor's college fund and Cordelia half-jokingly tries to tell him to use it for a boat or a ski home.

Continuity
Taken together with "Doublemeat Palace" (aired a week later), this explores both Buffy and Angel dealing with the suddenly critical issue of money.
Angel Investigations suddenly becomes quite well known when a website is created and the team starts handing out fliers.
Gunn and Wesley both begin to display feelings for Fred.

External links

 

Angel (season 3) episodes
2002 American television episodes
Television episodes about zombies